Reverse cowgirl may refer to:

 Reverse cowgirl (sex position)
 "Reverse Cowgirl" (song), a 2010 song on T-Pain's album RevolveR
 "Reverse Cowgirl" (South Park), an episode from the sixteenth season of South Park
 Reverse Cowgirl, a 2020 book by McKenzie Wark
 The Reverse Cowgirl, a blog by Susannah Breslin